Kingston Peak is the only named peak in the Kingston Range, a small desert mountain range in San Bernardino County, California, in the Mojave Desert. Kingston Peak's prominence makes it among the top 200 mountains by prominence in the contiguous United States, and the 23rd most prominent peak in California. 

Kingston Peak and the Kingston Range lie within the Kingston Range Wilderness, administered by the Bureau of Land Management (BLM) and one of California's most botanically diverse desert regions. One of only three white fir stands in the California deserts is found on the slopes of two drainages just below the summit of Kingston Peak. 

Kingston Peak and Range also form part of the Basin and Range Province, along with neighboring mountains and ranges, such as the Mesquite Mountains to the east, and the Nopah Range to the northwest.

Naming 
The origin of the name Kingston as applied to Kingston Peak and Range is unknown. It dates back at least to the early 1860s and possibly earlier. One account says it was applied by a member of John C. Frémont's second expedition into the American West, after the settlement of  Kingston, New York.

See also 

 Shadow Mountains
 Tecopa, California

References 

Mountains of San Bernardino County, California
North American 2000 m summits